The Shire of Woorayl was a local government area about  southeast of Melbourne, the state capital of Victoria, Australia.

History

Initially part of the Shire of Narracan, Woorayl was first incorporated as a shire on 25 May 1888. It annexed the South Riding of the Shire of Alberton on 14 March 1890, and the Mirboo Riding of the Shire of Traralgon on 1 May 1891. Over the next 20 years, various boundary changes occurred between Woorayl, Korumburra, Narracan, and South Gippsland.

On 2 December 1994, the Shire of Woorayl was abolished, and along with the Shires of Mirboo, South Gippsland and parts of the Shire of Korumburra, was merged into the new Shire of South Gippsland. The area around Inverloch was transferred into the newly created Shire of Bass Coast.

Wards

Woorayl was divided into four ridings in May 1975, each of which elected three councillors:
 North Riding
 Central Riding
 West Riding
 South Riding

Towns and localities

 Dumbalk
 Hallston
 Inverloch
 Koonwarra
 Leongatha*
 Leongatha South
 Meeniyan
 Mount Eccles
 Nerrena
 Ruby
 Tarwin Lower
 Venus Bay

* Council seat.

Population

* Estimate in the 1958 Victorian Year Book.

References

External links
 Victorian Places - Woorayl Shire

Woorayl